Jim Bown (born June 24, 1960) is an American former stock car racing driver. He has run a total of 23 Winston Cup Series races. He scored one top-ten result, a tenth-place finish at Riverside International Raceway in 1982. In the NASCAR Busch Series, he competed in 122 races, with four top-fives and one pole. He also made one Craftsman Truck Series race in 1997 at Portland Speedway and he finished sixteenth.

He is the younger brother of 1990 Busch champion Chuck Bown.

Motorsports career results

NASCAR
(key) (Bold – Pole position awarded by qualifying time. Italics – Pole position earned by points standings or practice time. * – Most laps led.)

Winston Cup Series

Daytona 500

Busch Series

Craftsman Truck Series

References

1960 births
Living people
NASCAR drivers
Racing drivers from Portland, Oregon